Pseudocatharylla inclaralis is a moth in the family Crambidae. It was described by Francis Walker in 1863. It is found in China (Kiangsu, Fokien, Kwangtung, Shantung) and Japan.

References

Crambinae
Moths described in 1863